Tom Klinkowstein born January 23, 1950, in Trenton, New Jersey, USA is an artist and President of Media A, LLC, a design and consulting group.

He is currently a professor at Hofstra University on Long Island, NY and an adjunct professor in the Graduate Communication Design Department at Pratt Institute in New York City.

His 10-meter long digital artwork, A Networked Designer's Critical Path: 1990–2090, was shown at the Fifth Avenue (New York City) Gallery of the American Institute of Graphic Design.

The Museum of Modern Art in New York acquired a poster designed by Tom Klinkowstein for a performance by the artist Laurie Anderson to be part of its permanent collection and the Designing Modern Women exhibition.

In July 2015, during the Natan Karczmar's ArtComTec seminars, with other art people, philosophers and other thinkers influenced by Marshall McLuhan, he presented his vision also influenced by Martin Buber.

References

1950 births
Living people
American designers
Hofstra University faculty
Artists from Trenton, New Jersey
Pratt Institute faculty